The Girl's Houseboy (El mucamo de la niña) is a 1951 Argentine musical comedy film, directed by Enrique Carreras on his directorial debut  with Juan Sires. It is based on a play by Nato Lamarque, which he adapted for the screen. It stars Lolita Torres, Alfredo Barbieri, Tito Climent and Gogó Andreu and was released on 24 October 1951 in Buenos Aires.

Plot
A young man goes to work as a servant in a millionaire's house to look after his daughter.

Cast
Lolita Torres as Lucy Saravia 
Alfredo Barbieri as Miguelito 
Tito Climent as Tito 
Gogó Andreu as Gogó 
Alejandro Maximino as don Roque Saravia 
Domingo Márquez as Eduardo 
Marcos Zucker as Alberto 
Max Citelli as Rómulo 
Virginia de la Cruz as Alicia
Gloria Castilla as Elsa
Jorge Larrea as poker player
Milita Brandon
 Rómulo Real
Fina Suárez

Reception
King in El Mundo said the film was: "Direct in its comedy and fast in its action." Raúl Manrupe and María Alejandra Portela in their book Un diccionario de films argentinos (1930–1995) write (translated from Spanish): "Enrique Carreras combined the songs of the juvenile Lolita and the humor of Barbieri to achieve a hit".

References

External links
 

1951 films
1950s Spanish-language films
Argentine black-and-white films
Argentine musical comedy films
1951 musical comedy films
1950s Argentine films
Films directed by Enrique Carreras